Mace is an unincorporated community in Pocahontas County, West Virginia, United States.

The community has the name of the local Mace family.

References

Unincorporated communities in Pocahontas County, West Virginia
Unincorporated communities in West Virginia